is a Japanese sprinter.

He won a silver medal in the 100 m at the 2011 World Youth Championships in Athletics, behind Odail Todd.

Personal bests

Records
100 metres
Former Japanese junior and Japanese high school record holder - 10.23 s (wind: +1.3 m/s) (Hiroshima, 29 April 2012)
4×100 m relay
Current Asian and Japanese junior record holder - 39.01 s (relay leg:1st) (Barcelona, 13 July 2012)
Current Japanese university record holder - 38.44 s (relay leg:4th) (Tianjin, 9 October 2013)
Current Japanese high school record holder - 39.16 s (relay leg: 1st) (Fukuroi, 3 May 2012)
Medley relay (100m×200m×300m×400m)
Former Japanese youth best holder - 1:50.69 s (relay leg: 1st) (Lille, 10 July 2011)
60 metres (Indoor)
Former Japanese junior record holder - 6.71 s (Osaka, 2 February 2013)

 with Akiyuki Hashimoto, Asuka Cambridge, and Kazuki Kanamori
 with Ryōta Yamagata, Shōta Iizuka, and Asuka Cambridge
 with Akiyuki Hashimoto, Tatsurō Suwa, and Kazuki Kanamori
 with Akiyuki Hashimoto, Shōtarō Aikyō, and Takuya Fukunaga

Competition record

National Championship

References

External links
 
 
 

1994 births
Living people
Japanese male sprinters
World Athletics Championships athletes for Japan
Universiade medalists in athletics (track and field)
Universiade gold medalists for Japan
Medalists at the 2015 Summer Universiade